Phare Ponleu Selpak (PPS, literally: "the Brightness of the Arts"), is a non-profit Cambodian association improving the lives of children, young adults, and their families with art schools, educational programs, and social support since 1994.

Phare Ponleu Selpak offers multidisciplinary schooling to young people, which gives them a perspective to make a living in art. Those taught typically come from poor backgrounds. The education is focused on self-realization and durability. Classes are given in subjects like theatre, acrobatics, music and a variety of art disciplines. PPS works was founded by Cambodians that had learned in refugee camps that art can be a means to forget trauma.

In the shows, themes are brought up such as genocide and other atrocities. Students of PPS have also acted abroad, like in Bangladesh and Thailand, and in September 2012 with their circus in Germany and Denmark. Annually PPS organizes the international circus festival Tini Tinou.

In 2012 Phare Ponleu Selpak was honored with a Prince Claus Award from the Netherlands for its role in the society by means of using culture.

References 

Cultural organisations based in Cambodia